Adrianne E. Gonzalez (born 1977) is an American songwriter, producer, composer, and mix engineer who works under the name AG.

Career
Gonzalez was born and raised in Miami, where she was a chorister and taught herself piano and guitar, taking up the latter at seventeen.

She has said of her beginnings:

I was in choir from a very early age. It was kind of my life since I was about eight. But I didn't know what that would mean for me when I was an adult, or as a career. I didn't even know what a career was in high school. But when I was in high school I heard the Indigo Girls for the first time. And I was like, "Okay! I wanna do that." It was definitely a pivotal moment. The first time I heard "Love Will Come to You," that's when I knew.

She went on to obtain a degree in music production and engineering from Boston's Berklee College of Music before moving to Los Angeles, where she is now based.

Gonzalez won the USA Songwriting Competition Grand Prize in 1999 for "Say 'em Strong"; the Boston Music Award for Best New Singer-Songwriter in 2000; and a SESAC Television and Film Composers Award in 2009 for her contribution to Guiding Light. She has also been a finalist in the Coca-Cola New Music Awards and the Lilith Fair Talent Search.

Gonzalez previously maintained a busy performance and recording schedule. She has supported Jeff Buckley, Jackson Browne, and Bonnie Raitt, among others, and released seven albums and two EPs under her own names (Adrianne until 2011, AG since 2012). In 2008, she joined with Kyler England, Rob Giles, and Gabriel Mann to form The Rescues. She now devotes her time to songwriting, composing, and producing songs with and for other artists and songwriters.

Soon after settling in Los Angeles, Gonzalez signed a publishing deal with Lionel Conway at the Mosaic Media Group. She is now published by the Kobalt Music Group. Between the ASCAP and SESAC databases she is listed as the author or co-author of more than 500 songs. AG’s catalogue has generated over 340 million streams and 390 million views on Youtube to date.

AG has collaborated with songwriters including Christina Perri, MILCK, Ciara, Natalie Imbruglia, KYGO, Bonnie McKee, and Aloe Blacc. Her work has amassed features in a long list of television shows (Grey’s Anatomy (ABC), Lucifer (Fox), Vida (STARZ), The Today Show (NBC), Cloak and Dagger (Freeform), Riverdale (The CW), and The Chilling Adventures of Sabrina (Netflix)), trailers and promos (Dolittle (Universal Pictures), The Handmaid's Tale (Hulu), A Beautiful Day In The Neighborhood (Sony Pictures), The Highwaymen (Netflix), League of Legends (Riot Games)), ad campaigns for brands like Starbucks, Ford, P&G, Cadillac, and Guess, and films (Hobbs and Shaw (Universal Pictures), The Last Witch Hunter (Lionsgate), and FOSTER (HBO)). AG co-wrote and produced Christina Perri's 2019 single 'Tiny Victories' for HBO's 'FOSTER', a documentary about the foster care system in Los Angeles, CA.

Notable credits

Discography

Producer and/or Writer 

All Fall Down - Garrison Starr (2013) Single
Discover: Songs Of The Rolling Stones Vol. 2 - Various Artists (2018) EP
(I Can't Get No) Satisfaction - Devvon Terrell (2018) Single
Say It Now - nilu (2019) Single
Humankind - Reuben And The Dark (2019) Single
My Love Will Never Die - Claire Wydham (2019) Single
Legendz - Devvon Terrlee (2019) Single
What A Wonderful World - Reuben And the Dark (2019) Single
Bad Feeling - Reuben And The Dark (2019) Single
I'm Comin Home - Aloe Blacc (2019) Single and Instrumental version
Tiny Victories - Christina Perri (From HBO's 'FOSTER')(2019) Single

Artist
Adrianne

 For Adeline (1998 / 2000)
 10,000 Stones (2004)
 Down to This (2005)
 Sweet Mistake (2006)
 Boy Songs (2007) EP
 Burn Me Up (2008)
 You Me Lonely (2009)
 Me After You (2012)
 Reimagine: The Beatles by AG (2012) EP

AG

Shelter You (2014) Single
Terrible Thing (2019) Album

The Rescues
 Crazy Ever After (2008) Album
All That I Want for Christmas (Is to Give My Love Away) (2009) Single
 The Rescues (2010) EP
Teenage Dream (2010) Single
 Let Loose the Horses (2010) Album
Blah Blah Love and War (2013) Album
The Rescues (2017) Album
Hold On (2019) Single

Footnotes

1977 births
Living people
21st-century American women singers
American women pop singers
American women singer-songwriters
American indie rock musicians
American LGBT musicians
21st-century American singers
American singer-songwriters
21st-century LGBT people